Humberto Busto Marín (born June 23, 1978, in Mexico City) is an actor, producer, and film director.

Biography 

Humberto Busto's feature film career began with his performance as Jorge in Amores perros (2000).

Busto's performance as Heriberto in Oso Polar won him awards for Best Actor in the 15th Morelia International Film Festival and the 5th Quito Latin American Film Festival, as well as an Ariel Award nomination.

He has been recognized as well for his work behind the camera. Under his direction, La teta de Botero (2014) and Julkita (2017) were winners of Best Short Narrative Made in Mexico award of the Oaxaca FilmFest.

Starting in 2010, Busto acted as the fastidious and self-important Apolinar Caborca in three seasons of the television series Los héroes del norte, His height (5  feet) made his character a frequent target of jokes.

Humberto Busto has a degree in Dramatic Arts from the University Theater Center of the National Autonomous University of Mexico. He is an alumnus of Berlinale Talents and studied for a master's degree in film production at California State University, Northridge.

Filmography

As director 

 Hasta la ciruela pasa (2012)
 La teta de Botero (2014)
 Julkita (2017)

As actor

Motion pictures 

 Amores perros (2000) as Jorge
 Sobreviviente (2003)
Transit (2005) as Champinon
 Morirse en Domingo (2006) as Carlos
Borderland (2007) as Mario
 Después de Lucía (2012) as Cook
Abolición de la propiedad (2012) as Everio
 El Incidente (2014) as Carlos
Los parecidos (2015) as Alvaro
 Hazlo como hombre (2017) as Eduardo
 Oso polar (2017) as Heriberto
El club de los insomnes (2018) as Compañero

Television series 

 Terminales (2008) as Elías Ruíz
 Los Héroes del Norte (2010) as Apolinar Caborca
 El Chapo (2018) as Conrado Sol (Don Sol)
 Diablero (2018) as Isaac El Indio
 El juego de las llaves (2019) as Óscar Romero
 High Heat (2022) as Ángel Linares

Additional awards and recognition 

 2015 - Best Ibero-American short film for La teta de Botero, Guadalajara International Film Festival
 2015 - Best short film for La teta de Botero, Guadalajara International Film Festival
 2017 - Breakthrough actor in a series, super-series, or telenovela for his role as Conrado Higuera Sol "Don Sol" in El Chapo, PRODU Awards

Footnotes

External links 
 
 
 B-art Talent Management

Mexican actors
Mexican producers
Mexican film directors
1978 births
Living people